Kosowo is the Polish name for Kosovo and may refer to the following places:
Kosowo, Nakło County in Kuyavian-Pomeranian Voivodeship (north-central Poland)
Kosowo, Świecie County in Kuyavian-Pomeranian Voivodeship (north-central Poland)
Kosowo, Tuchola County in Kuyavian-Pomeranian Voivodeship (north-central Poland)
Kosowo, Gniezno County in Greater Poland Voivodeship (west-central Poland)
Kosowo, Gostyń County in Greater Poland Voivodeship (west-central Poland)
Kosowo, Pomeranian Voivodeship (north Poland)

See also 
 Kosovo (disambiguation)
 Kosów (disambiguation)